Rabidosaurus is an extinct genus of large herbivorous dicynodont of the family Kannemeyeriidae from the Anisian Donguz Formation, Russia.

See also 
 List of therapsids

Anomodont genera
Kannemeyeriiformes
Anisian life
Triassic synapsids of Asia
Triassic Russia
Fossils of Russia
Fossil taxa described in 1970